KWPN (640 kHz, "ESPN Radio 640") is a commercial AM radio station licensed to Moore, Oklahoma, and serving the Oklahoma City metropolitan area.  It is owned by Cumulus Media and airs a sports format.  While Cumulus owns three sports stations in Oklahoma City, WWLS-FM and WKY have mostly local shows on weekdays, while KWPN carries mostly syndicated programming from ESPN Radio.  The studios and offices are on NW 64th Street in Northwest Oklahoma City.

KWPN's transmitter is off West Indian Hills Road in Norman.  It broadcasts at 5,000 watts by day; because AM 640 is a clear channel frequency, reserved for Class A KFI in Los Angeles, KWPN must reduce power to 1,000 watts at night to avoid interference.  A directional antenna is used at all times.

History

University of Oklahoma
On September 26, 1922, the station signed on as WNAD in Norman.  It was owned by the University of Oklahoma, with its studios located in Science Hall.  In the early days of broadcasting, several universities put non-commercial radio stations on the air as a service to students, faculty and the local community.  From 1929 to 1941, WNAD broadcast on 1010 kilocycles and was required to go off the air at sunset.

In 1941, when the North American Regional Broadcasting Agreement (NARBA) was enacted, the station moved to 640 kHz.  Being lower on the dial gave WNAD a wider coverage area, though the station was still required to be off the air at night, to protect 50,000-watt clear channel KFI in Los Angeles (as AM radio waves travel further at night).

Ownership changes
In 1973, after the university put an FM station KGOU on the air, it decided to sell the AM station.  WNAD was acquired by Oklahoma Communications, Inc., and became a Mutual Broadcasting System network affiliate.

The station was acquired by Norman Broadcasting in 1981.  It switched its call sign to WWLS.  It is unusual for stations in Oklahoma to have call letters beginning with a "W", as nearly all start with a "K."  Because the station traces its history back to 1922, when Oklahoma was in W territory, the station was granted new call letters beginning with a W from the Federal Communications Commission.

Sports radio
In 1989, WWLS was acquired by Fox Broadcasting.  It was not associated with the Fox Television Network, but owned by local businessman John Fox.  A sports radio format was started.  The new management changed the station's city of license with the FCC to Moore.  This was coupled with permission to broadcast around the clock at 1,000 watts.  A few years later, daytime power was boosted to 5,000 watts.

In 1999, WWLS was acquired by Citadel Broadcasting, the forerunner to today's Cumulus Broadcasting.  It flipped to a sports radio format, calling itself "The Sports Animal."  It later received an FM simulcast on 98.1, which became WWLS-FM.  On April 2, 2012, WWLS AM split from its "Sports Animal" simulcast with WWLS-FM and switched to mostly programming from ESPN Radio under new call letters KWPN.  WWLS-FM continued with mostly local sports programming on weekdays, and later began simulcasting on co-owned WKY. On nights and weekends, all three stations often carry the same ESPN Radio programming.

References

External links

FCC History Cards for KWPN

WPN
Sports radio stations in the United States
Cumulus Media radio stations
Oklahoma City Thunder
Radio stations established in 1922
1922 establishments in Oklahoma
Radio stations licensed before 1923 and still broadcasting
ESPN Radio stations